Käsbach is a small river of Hesse, Germany. It flows into the Main in Kostheim.

See also

List of rivers of Hesse

Rivers of Hesse
Geography of Wiesbaden
Rivers of Germany